André Luciano Segatti (born May 15, 1972) is a Brazilian actor, model and reality television personality, best known for being the runner-up of the second season of the Brazilian version of The Farm.

Filmography

External links 
 

1972 births
Living people
Male actors from São Paulo
Brazilian people of Italian descent
Brazilian male television actors
Brazilian male telenovela actors
Brazilian male film actors
The Farm (TV series) contestants